Kopino, or Korinoy in Filipino slang (a combination of "Korean" and "Pinoy"), is a term to call a person of mixed Korean and Filipino descent.

Background
A Filipino delegate at the 2005 international conference of ECPAT called for an investigation into the proliferation of Kopinos. According to the delegate, when the Korean fathers return to [South] Korea, most of them stop contacting their children in the Philippines and no longer provide any form of support. The responsibility then falls on the Filipina mother who is forced to raise the child herself. The Philippines is a strong Catholic nation that gives importance to the preservation of life, thus stigmatising alternatives such as abortion and the use of contraceptives. As a result, Kopino children are raised in a single parent household without any contact from their Korean father. This problem is a consequence of sex tourism in the Philippines by Korean men, specifically within areas such as Angeles City. As their fathers are not married to their mothers, the children are unable to obtain South Korean citizenship. As recently as 2003, Kopinos were believed to number fewer than 1,000; another 9,000 were born from 2003 to 2008. As a result, the Filipino perception of Korean men has been that of a negative view. 
In response, South Korean NGOs such as the Daejeon Migrant Workers Support Center, alongside locally established NGOs like the Kopino Children Center, have begun to establish branch offices in the Philippines to provide social services to Kopino children and their mothers.

There are also Filipino Amerasians, Japinos, and Sinopinos in the Philippines.

Comparison to Lai Dai Han
A 2016 article in The Sungkyun Times said that Kopinos are referred to as the "New Lai Dai Han", and a 2013 article in The Granite Tower said that Kopinos are considered to be the "second version of Lai Dai Han".

Kopino population
A 2008 article in The Korea Times said that there may have been 10,000 Kopinos in 2008, in comparison to around 100,000-200,000 Japinos and 50,000 Ameripinos.

The 2008 news article also said that it was estimated that there were 1,000 Kopinos in 2003.

A 2011 article in Sun.Star Cebu said that Yoon Ji-hyun, president of the Kopino Foundation Inc. in Cebu, said that most Kopinos live in Quezon City.

The 'Mixed Filipino Heritage Act of 2020' estimated there were 30,000 Kopinos.

Profile of the parents of Kopinos

Profile of the Korean fathers
A 2016 article in The Sungkyun Times said that "the most important" factor that was causing more Kopinos to be fathered by Korean men was that the Korean men were deceiving the Filipino women about their intentions to have a future together with the Filipino women. The 2016 article said that 90% of the Korean fathers of Kopinos were students who were in their twenties.

South Korean television network MBC made a video where they interviewed Filipino hostesses at a hostess bar which was located somewhere on the island of Cebu in the Philippines. In the English-language dub by Link TV of the original MBC video, the video's narrator explained that "Most of the Korean men who solicit prostitution don't want to use a condom, causing prostitutes to get pregnant with their babies". In the dubbed video, a Filipino bar hostess was asked the question "Are there many Korean babies?" by an interviewer to which she replied "Almost, Korean men don't use a condom".

A 2016 article in The Korea Times said that ECPAT Korea classified the fathers of Kopinos into three broad categories. It said that there were young Korean men in school who went to the Philippines for the purpose of learning English, and it said that there were middle-aged Korean men who went to the Philippines for business reasons. Third, it said that there were Korean men who stayed in the Philippines for a short time for reasons of prostitution.

Profile of the Filipino mothers
In a 2016 article in The Sungkyun Times, 80% of Filipinos are Catholics, and Catholics are supposedly discouraged from using artificial contraceptives and abortion. This religious factor of Filipino women contributed to the increase of Kopinos. The article said that 90% of the Filipino mothers of Kopinos who had talked to the We Love Kopino organization were women who worked by teaching English or doing some other type of work that did not involve prostitution. The article said that this high percentage of non-prostitutes was contrary to the idea that the majority of the Filipino mothers of Kopinos were prostitutes.

South Korean television network MBC made a video where they interviewed Filipino hostesses at a hostess bar which was located somewhere on the island of Cebu in the Philippines. In the English-language dub by Link TV of the original MBC video, the narrator referenced the hostess bar when he said that "Many of the women who work here are Kopino mothers working to support their babies after being abandoned by Korean men," and the narrator said that  "The majority of Kopinos are born from hostess bars."

Korean men soliciting prostitutes
South Korean television network MBC did a video that talked about Korean men soliciting prostitutes in the Philippines. In the English-language dub by Link TV of the original MBC video, the narrator said, "With more and more Koreans visiting the Philippines to study or for vacation, the number of Koreans in the Philippines has increased four times in the last ten years. This has led tourism companies in to create prostitution tours, attracting Korean men."  The narrator then stopped talking, and a "tour guide" whose face was blurred out said, "We have a night tour in our travel course. It usually costs a hundred dollars for four people."  The narrator then resumed talking, and the narrator said, "Neon signs still shine brightly from the hostess bar for Koreans on Cebu street. About two-hundred and fifty Koreans have been arrested for soliciting prostitution in the Philippines during the last five years, more than any other group of foreigners." The Philippine Government is on crack down for these illegal activities.

Views of the issue
A 2015 article in Bangor Daily News said that Koreans were embarrassed about the Kopino issue, and it said that Koreans felt that not helping Kopinos made Koreans look "dishonest" due to the Kopino issue bearing comparison to the issue of the Japanese use of comfort women during the Second World War.

In a 2013 article in The Korea Times, an official of a Filipino woman's organization stated that "Filipinos believe that all Korean men are turning Filipino women into victims. This could increase anti-Korean sentiments in the Philippines."

A 2013 article in The Granite Tower said that collective anger towards Korean men who had abandoned their Kopino children in the Philippines had definitely created anti-Korean sentiment in the Philippines as of 2013.

A 2016 article in The Sungkyun Times said that there was formerly a trend among Filipino women to invest in the concept of a "Korean Dream", where they could potentially improve their situation by marrying a Korean man in the hopes of moving to Korea. However, the news article stated that this hope was gradually replaced by "disappointment and hatred" towards South Korea as a while, due to the aforementioned Filipino women witnessing the pattern of Korean men abandoning them and their Kopino children over the years. Due to the increasing number of Kopinos, the 2016 news article said that the Kopino issue has resulted in an increase of anti-Korean sentiment in the Philippines.

Response

Website to find Kopino fathers
Goo Bon-chang was a man who created a website in April 2015 that had pictures and other identifying information posted on it about Korean fathers who had abandoned their Kopino children to help find the Korean father. The website got its pictures from a civic group which received the pictures from Filipino mothers of abandoned Kopino children. The website creator said that some people were threatening to sue him for privacy invasion, but he doubted that they could sue him, because he felt that abandoning Kopino children was worse than what he was doing by exposing them for it. From April 2015 to January 2016, 30 Kopino children found their Korean father as a result of the 42 pictures of Korean fathers on the website.

A 2016 article in The Korea Times said that a lawyer said that the website did not break South Korean law, because the website was defaming the Korean fathers of abandoned Kopino children "in pursuit of the public interest" while other lawyers claimed that the website broke South Korean law.

South Korean citizenship for Kopinos
A 2016 article in The Sungkyun Times said that some advocates for Kopinos think that the South Korean government should do something for Kopinos in a similar way to what the Japanese government did for Japinos in the past when the Japino issue became a big issue. The Japanese government gave the Filipino women of Japino children money for living expenses, and the Japanese government gave the Filipino women of Japino children the ability to become Japanese citizens.

A 2015 article in The Granite Tower said that Han Moon-gi, chairman of the Korea Kopino Association, said that the South Korean government should handle the Kopino issue like the Japanese government handled the Japino issue. The Japanese government helped Japinos get jobs, it helped Japinos with education, it helped Japinos with welfare and it allowed Japinos to get Japanese citizenship.

A 2012 article in ABS-CBN said that a Korean father would have to acknowledge a Kopino child as his child before the Kopino could become a South Korean citizen, and it said that the Kopino child would have to file a lawsuit against the Korean father if the Korean father did not want to acknowledge the Kopino child as his child.

Multicultural Family Support denied
A 2015 article in The Dong-a Ilbo said that Kopinos could not benefit from South Korea's Multicultural Family Support Law, because Kopinos did not have South Korean nationality.

Child support rulings
A Korean man was ordered to pay child support in a landmark South Korean court ruling involving a Kopino child that happened on June 22, 2014. The South Korean government paid 10,000,000 won to get the DNA of the two Kopino sons tested, and the South Korean court forced the Korean man under threat of legal penalties to get his DNA tested too. A 2016 article in The Korea Times said that after being found to be the father, the South Korean court ruled that the Korean man had to pay 300,000 won every month as child support. A 2014 article in Yonhap said that the lawyer for the Filipino mother in this case said that the Filipino mother wanted her Kopino sons to be raised in South Korea, and the lawyer said that the Filipino mother wanted her Kopino sons to be added to the official family register of their Korean father.

A 2016 article in The Hankyoreh said that another paternity court ruling in South Korea that involved a Kopino child happened on May 28, 2015. In the 2015 ruling, the Korean man was ordered by the South Korean court to pay 500,000 won (US$450) every month for each of his two Kopino sons until the Kopino sons became adults and to pay an additional 20,000,000 won (US$17,800) in back child support.

South Korean lawmakers meeting
A 2013 article in ABS-CBN said that on December 21, 2012, Jasmine Lee and four other South Korean lawmakers met with Filipino mothers of Kopino children at the Kopino Children Association in the Philippines. The news article said that these five South Korean lawmakers pledged that they would help the Kopino children.

Book by university students
A 2017 article in The Hankyoreh said that a group of 7 students from Chonbuk National University did research and case studies in the Philippines related to the Kopino issue for more than a year, and then the group published a book about the Kopino issue which was available as an e-book and a hard copy book which was not for sale. The name of the book was I'll Keep Watching and Looking After You, and Chonbuk National University has copies of the book in its library.

Urgency of the issue
A 2016 article in The Korea Times said that the South Korean government claimed that the numerous murders of Koreans in the Philippines was an issue that was more urgent than the "half-breed" Kopino babies issue.

Media
Singaporean English news agency Channel NewsAsia published a video to their YouTube channel on Feb 11, 2014, where they interviewed a Filipino woman whose Korean husband abandoned her after she gave birth to his daughter. The Filipino woman said, "I tried to call my husband a lot back in 2005. He would answer, 'Hello' and then hang up."

A 2012 article in ABS-CBN said that Jasmine Lee said that the documentaries about Kopinos that aired on three major South Korean TV stations in 2011 were selling the story like the Filipino mothers of the Kopinos were sex workers.

South Korean television network MBC did a news story about an 18-year-old Filipino woman who said that she was raped by a Korean man in his thirties when she was 17 years old, an encounter that resulted in her Kopino child. The Filipino woman said that the Korean man promised her Filipino parents that he would pay child support if she promised not to sue him. The Filipino woman said that the Korean man then fled to South Korea and never returned.

South Korean television network SBS did a video that was published on July 6, 2014, on their YouTube channel where they interviewed a Filipino mother of three Kopino children. The Filipino mother was referring to the children's father when she said, "He said wait for me, just waiting, and I'm busy in Korea, sometimes busy, so I can't telephone. I'm waiting only, but, I believe him. I really believe him, their father... The difficult things that came to us is sometimes my children seek very hard..."

South Korean television network KBS did a video that was published on August 16, 2015, on their YouTube channel where they interviewed a Filipino mother of a Kopino child. The Filipino mother was referring to the child's father when she said, "And he said, no, I'm very serious. I'm not like other Korean guy, study in Cebu. I'm very, very serious, and this time is, uh, not true... He
send me money, fifteen thousand for the hospital bill. And he said, um, he come back after the problem solved with his, uh, mother. But, after that, no... In my opinion, posting picture is a good idea, if, uh, there is no other way to find his, uh, her father."

A 2015 article in The Granite Tower said that Han Moon-gi, chairman of the Korea Kopino Association, an association to help Kopinos, said that his association got volunteers and supporters due to media coverage of the Kopino issue, and Han said that media coverage is important for helping Kopinos.

A 2009 news article in The Sookmyung Times said that the Yomiuri Shimbun, a Japanese newspaper, did a broadcast about the Kopino issue in 2008, and The Sookmyung Times said that the Japanese newspaper's portrayal of the issue derided Korean men and portrayed the Kopino issue in a negative way. The Sookmyung Times said that the Japanese broadcast caused South Korea to lose its national image and lose its confidence.

Lives of Kopinos
A 2009 news article said that a Kopino male whose Korean father abandoned his Filipino mother when she got pregnant used his fist to beat up on a picture of his Korean father to show how much he hated his Korean father.

A 2009 news article said that Kopinos without a legal father could not enroll in school in the Philippines, because a legal father was needed to provide a name in the Filipino family register which was a requirement to attend elementary school in the Philippines under Filipino law.

A 2009 news article said that Kopinos were not considered to be Filipinos in the Philippines, it said that they were discriminated against by employers in the Philippines, and it said that they were the "laughingstock" of their Filipino playmates while growing up in the Philippines.

A 2014 article in The Philippine Star said that "some" Kopinos do "video and Internet porn".

A 2015 article in Bangor Daily News said that many Kopinos become prostitutes.

A 2016 article in The Korea Times said that Kopinos "often" become involved in prostitution or organized crime.

Kopinos in popular culture
In the KBS1 2014 South Korean drama You Are the Only One, a Kopino known as Verillio Lee Nam-soon (portrayed by Kim Min-kyo) arrived in Seoul from Iloilo in search of his Korean birth father.

See also
Prostitution in South Korea
KoreKorea, girls in Kiribati who are paid for sex by Korean males.
Lai Đại Hàn, Prostitution and rape by Korean soldiers in Vietnam.

References

Korean diaspora in Asia
Philippines–South Korea relations
Prostitution in the Philippines
Comfort women